Mahvarmilani District is a district (bakhsh) in Mamasani County, Fars Province, Iran. At the 2006 census, its population was 9,915, in 2,277 families.  The District has one city Baba Monir. The District has two rural districts (dehestan): Mahur Rural District and Mishan Rural District.

References 

Mamasani County
Districts of Fars Province